Sailing was contested at the 2002 Asian Games from October 3 to October 9. Competition took place in various sailing disciplines at the Busan Yachting Center. 15 Gold medals were awarded in the various classes competing, from the Olympic 470 and Mistral to the Junior Optimist, in a regatta that saw very few of the eleven scheduled races not completed for all classes.

Schedule

Medalists

Men

Women

Open

Medal table

Participating nations
A total of 128 athletes from 16 nations competed in sailing at the 2002 Asian Games:

References

2002 Asian Games Report, Pages 572–586

External links
Official website

 
2002 Asian Games events
2002
Asian Games
2002 Asian Games